Lionel Jack Dumbleton (1905 – 25 September 1976) was a New Zealand entomologist. He was born in Hampden, New Zealand and was a founding member of the Entomological Society of New Zealand.

One of his most remarkable biological discoveries was a new genus of caddis-fly-like primitive moths that he described as Agathiphaga (Dumbleton, 1952) and which has been subsequently raised to superfamily level as the second most primitive known living lineage of moths, Agathiphagoidea.

In 1998 a new genus of hepialid moths was named Dumbletonius in his honour, and Hort Research has a building in Auckland named after him.

References

Dumbleton, L.F. (1952). A new genus of seed-infesting micropterygid moths. Pacific Science, 6: 17–29.

1905 births
1976 deaths
New Zealand entomologists
20th-century New Zealand zoologists